Else Bugge Fougner (born 9 November 1944) is a Norwegian lawyer and a politician for the Conservative Party.

She was born in Moss as a daughter of Jacob C. Bugge (1912–1993) and Bodil Bengtson (born 1919). In August 1974 she married lawyer Amund Fougner. Through her sister Kari she is a sister-in-law of Gunnar Gran.

She was the Minister of Justice 1989–1990.

References

External links 
 Else Bugge Fougner

1944 births
Living people
People from Moss, Norway
Government ministers of Norway
20th-century Norwegian lawyers
Norwegian women lawyers
Female justice ministers
Ministers of Justice of Norway